Rachael Chadwick (born 20 August 1990 in Chester) is an English professional squash player. As of February 2018, she was ranked number 65 in the world.

References

1990 births
Living people
English female squash players